Code page 1010 (CCSID 1010), also known as CP1010, is the French version of ISO/IEC 646.

Codepage layout

See also
Code page 1104 (similar DEC NRCS code page)

References

1010